Micăuți is a commune in Strășeni District, Moldova. It is composed of two villages, Gornoe and Micăuți.

References

Communes of Strășeni District